Balhinch is two-mile-square unincorporated community in Union Township, Montgomery County, in the U.S. state of Indiana.  Balhinch includes Rattlesnake Canyon and Weir Cemetery.

History
The Balhinch area was originally settled by William Offield in February 1821, five miles southwest of Crawfordsville in Section 21 in an area with two streams — Sugar Creek and Offield's Creek.  A monument to William Offield stands near Offield's Creek.

It was formally platted in the 1920s and the boundaries legally defined.

Notable person
Caroline Virginia Krout, author

Gallery

References

Unincorporated communities in Montgomery County, Indiana
Unincorporated communities in Indiana